The Balkan Women's Football League is a supranational championship for women's football clubs from Balkan countries. The inaugural edition is scheduled to start on 11 October 2012, with eight teams from Albania, Bosnia and Herzegovina, Bulgaria, Macedonia, Montenegro, Romania and Serbia. The competition is also open to Croatian, Greek, Serbian and Turkish clubs.

2012-13 teams
  Tirana
  2000 Sarajevo
  Sportika Blagoevgrad
  Biljanini Izvori
  Pobeda Prilep
  Podgorica
  Real Craiova
  Masinac Nis

2015-16 teams 
1st place   Masinac Nis
2nd place   PAOK
3rd place   CS Navobi Iasi
4th place   Olympia Sofia
5th place   Mixed Thrace

References

Women's football friendly trophies